Trond is a Norwegian male given name. The base of the name, Tron'r (Þróndr or Þrándr), is Old Norse and means "to grow and thrive" (þroásk). 17785 people in Norway have Trond as their first name, making it the 23rd most used name (2008). The name is connected to one of the largest subgroups of Norwegians, the Trønders of Trøndelag, but also in connection with people from Trondheim.

The name Trond may refer to:

People
Trond Abrahamsen (born 1960), Norwegian ice hockey player
Trond Amundsen (born 1957), Norwegian biologist
Trond Amundsen (born 1971), Norwegian football coach
Trond Andersen (born 1975), Norwegian footballer
Trond Andresen (born 1947), Norwegian engineer and political activist
Trond Fausa Aurvåg (born 1972), Norwegian actor
Trond Barthel (born 1970), Norwegian pole vaulter
Trond Berg (born 1934), Norwegian cell physiologist
Trond Bergh (born 1946), Norwegian historian
Trond Bersu (born 1984), Norwegian drummer and producer
Trond Erik Bertelsen (born 1984), Norwegian footballer
Trond Birkedal (born 1980), Norwegian politician 
Trond Bjørndal (born 1969), Norwegian footballer and coach
Trond André Bolle (1968–2010), Norwegian military officer
Trond Brænne (1953–2013), Norwegian actor and writer
Trond Bråthen (1977–2012), Norwegian musician
Trond-Arne Bredesen (born 1967), Norwegian Nordic combined skier
Trond H. Diseth (born 1957), Norwegian child psychiatrist 
Trond Dolva (born 1934), Norwegian judge
Trond Einar Elden (born 1970), Norwegian skier 
Trond Eliassen (born 1922), Norwegian architect
Trond Berg Eriksen (born 1945), Norwegian historian 
Trond Fevolden (born 1951), Norwegian civil servant
Trond Frønes (born 1978), Norwegian musician
Trond Giske (born 1966), Norwegian politician
Trond Granlund (born 1950), Norwegian singer and guitarist
Trond Inge Haugland (born 1976), Norwegian footballer
Trond Heggestad (born 1978), Norwegian footballer
Trond Hegna (1898–1992), Norwegian journalist and politician
Trond Heir (born 1958), Norwegian psychiatrist and military physician
Trond Helleland (born 1962), Norwegian politician
Trond Henriksen (born 1964), Norwegian footballer and coach 
Trond Høiby (born 1973), Norwegian decathlete 
Trond Iversen (born 1976), Norwegian cross-country skier
Trond Jensrud (born 1968), Norwegian politician
Trond Kirkvaag (1946–2007), Norwegian comedian and actor
Trond Kjøll (born 1953), Norwegian rifle shooter and coach
Trond Kverno (born 1945), Norwegian composer
Trond Lode (born 1974), Norwegian politician
Trond Lykke (1946–2020), Norwegian merchant
Trond Fredrik Ludvigsen (born 1982), Norwegian footballer
Trond Magnussen (born 1973), Norwegian ice hockey player
Trond Martiniussen (born 1945), Norwegian wrestler
Trond Mohn (born 1943), Norwegian businessman 
Trond Peter Stamsø Munch (born 1960), Norwegian actor
Trond Nilssen (born 1990), Norwegian actor
Trond Nordby (born 1943), Norwegian historian and political scientist
Trond Nordseth (born 1974), Norwegian footballer
Trond Nymark (born 1976), Norwegian race walker
Trond Olsen (born 1984), Norwegian footballer
Trond Einar Pedersli, Norwegian orienteer
Trond Jøran Pedersen (born 1958), Norwegian ski jumper
Trond Pedersen (born 1951), Norwegian footballer 
Trond Reinertsen (born 1945), Norwegian economist and businessman 
Trond Reinholdtsen (born 1972), Norwegian composer and vocalist
Trond Espen Seim (born 1971), Norwegian actor
Trond Sirevåg (born 1955), Norwegian footballer and football manager
Trond Skramstad (born 1960), Norwegian decathlete
Trond Soleng (born 1973), Norwegian footballer
Trond Sollied (born 1959), Norwegian footballer and manager
Trond Egil Soltvedt (born 1967), Norwegian footballer
Trond Strande (born 1970), Norwegian footballer and coach
Trond Viggo Toresen (born 1978), Norwegian footballer 
Trond Helge Torsvik (born 1957), Norwegian geophysicsist 
Trond Trondsen (born 1994), Norwegian cyclist
Trond Vinterstø (born 1973), Norwegian footballer
Trond Waage (born 1953), Norwegian child rights expert

See also
Tron (disambiguation)

Norwegian masculine given names